Chase "That Golden Thunder" (2000 – July 8, 2013) was a Golden Retriever who served as "bat dog" and mascot for the Trenton Thunder minor league baseball team.

Life
Chase served as "bat dog" during the first inning at most Trenton Thunder home games, retrieving bats and balls and returning them to the Thunder dugout. Contrary to popular belief, his teeth did not leave marks in the equipment, as retrievers are trained to carry birds without puncturing them. Later in the game, Chase usually caught frisbees to win a cash prize for a lucky fan. He also carried balls and waters to the umpires during the game. He did, however, have a golden tooth due to his bat carrying duties. Chase had garnered significant media attention, appearing on FOX, CNN, YES Network, UPN9, WNBC4, and even Japanese television.

In 2008, Chase sired a litter of pups. One of the pups was trained to be his successor and was named Home Run Derby (or Derby for short) in a fan poll during the offseason.  Another of the pups from that litter was named Ollie, and currently serves in a batdog capacity for the New Hampshire Fisher Cats. Derby sired pups in 2013, with one of them, named "Rookie", being trained to eventually succeed him as a third-generation bat dog.

On June 4, 2013, Chase was honored at Yankee Stadium by special invitation of New York Yankees General Manager Brian Cashman.  He was the first canine to be so honored.

On July 5, 2013, Chase had a retirement party thrown by the Thunder, complete with a video tribute. The first 2,000 fans received Chase bobbleheads and fans were encouraged to bring their own dogs to the game.

On August 11, 2015, Chase's son Derby "narrated" an ESPN E:60 feature on the Chase and his family of bat-retrieving dogs.

Death
Chase died on July 8, 2013. He was diagnosed with lymphoma in February and had been suffering from arthritis.

See also
 List of individual dogs

References

2000 animal births
2013 animal deaths
Minor League Baseball mascots
Individual dogs in the United States